Unda or UNDA may refer to:

 Unda (genus), a genus of Amoebozoa
 Unda (plural "undae"), a term for an extraterrestrial dune field
 Unda (organization), the International Catholic Association for Radio and Television which was merged with OCIC to form SIGNIS in 2001
 Unda (film), a Malayalam-language action comedy film
 University of Notre Dame Australia